Pojoaque Valley Public Schools is a school district with its headquarters in an unincorporated area in Santa Fe County, New Mexico, United States, with a Santa Fe, New Mexico post office address.

Pojoaque Valley Schools serves the Pojoaque Valley area in northern Santa Fe County; it does not include any portions of Santa Fe proper. The district has one high school, one middle school, one intermediate school, one sixth grade academy and one elementary.

Service area
It serves Cundiyo, Cuyamungue, Cuyamungue Grant, El Rancho, Jacona, Jaconita, Nambe, Pojoaque, San Ildefonso Pueblo, Tesuque Pueblo, most of El Valle de Arroyo Seco, most of Peak Place, a portion of La Tierra, and a portion of Tano Road.

School Board

Schools
 Pojoaque Valley High School (9-12)
 Pojoaque Valley Middle School (7-8)
 Sixth Grade Academy (6)
 Pojoaque Valley Intermediate School (4-5)
 Pablo Roybal Elementary School (K-3)

The elementary, intermediate, and high schools are on the Jacona campus. This campus, which also has the administration building, is near but not inside the Jacona census-designated place and has a Santa Fe, New Mexico postal address (but is not in Santa Fe).

The 6th grade and middle school are on the Pojoaque Campus, which is in the Pojoaque CDP. In the 1990 U.S. Census and the 2000 U.S. Census this area was in the Jaconita CDP.

In 2006 the board of trustees voted to approve the design of an intermediate school which was to be built.

References

External links
 Pojoaque Valley Schools

School districts in New Mexico
Education in Santa Fe County, New Mexico